Wolf is an unincorporated community in Clinton Township, Saint Louis County, Minnesota, United States.

The community is located immediately south of the city of Mountain Iron, near the intersection of Saint Louis County Road 101 (Kane Road) and County Road 955 (Wolf Road).  Iron Junction is nearby.

References

Unincorporated communities in Minnesota
Unincorporated communities in St. Louis County, Minnesota